The Boulder Post Office, also known as Boulder Main Post Office, at 1905 Fifteenth St. in Boulder, Colorado, was built in 1910.  It was listed on the National Register of Historic Places at US Post Office--Boulder Main in 1986.

It is a rectangular building taking up nearly all of the site's  footprint.  It has Renaissance Revival and Classical Revival details and was designed by the supervising architect of the U.S. Treasury James Knox Taylor.  It has a metal hipped roof.

It was deemed significant as "a well preserved and rare example of the type of post office building constructed during James Knox Taylor's tenure as Supervising Architect. The building is a notable interpretation of Classical and Renaissance Revival styling and has considerable urban design significance in relation to the town's civic center."

It is also a contributing building in the Downtown Boulder Historic District, which was NRHP-listed in 1980.

Following the 2021 Boulder shooting, local Congressman Joe Neguse introduced legislation to have the post office named after police officer Eric Talley, who was killed while responding to the shooting.

Notes

References

National Register of Historic Places in Boulder County, Colorado
Government buildings completed in 1910
Post office buildings on the National Register of Historic Places in Colorado
Downtown Boulder Historic District
Post office buildings in Colorado
Neoclassical architecture in Colorado
1910 establishments in Colorado
Buildings and structures in Boulder, Colorado